Paenochrobactrum pullorum is a Gram-negative, oxidase-positive, non-spore-forming, rod-shaped, nonmotile bacterium of the genus Paenochrobactrum, which was isolated from faeces of a chicken in Germany

References

External links
Type strain of Paenochrobactrum pullorum at BacDive -  the Bacterial Diversity Metadatabase

Hyphomicrobiales
Bacteria described in 2014